The 1927 NC State Wolfpack football team represented North Carolina State University  during the 1927 Southern Conference football season. They played their home games in Raleigh, North Carolina. The Wolfpack were coached by Gus Tebell in his third year as head coach, compiling a record of 9–1 and outscoring opponents 216 to 69.

NC State tied with Georgia Tech and Tennessee for the Southern Conference title, including the only unbeaten and untied conference record. Also in the conference were Bill Spears-led Vanderbilt (giving both Tech and Tennessee their ties) and Georgia's "dream and wonder team." NC State was led by All-Southern running back and College Football Hall of Fame inductee Jack McDowall.

Schedule

Game summaries

Week 1: Elon

Week 2: at Furman
In the second week, NC State suffered the season's only loss on the road to the Furman Purple Hurricane 0–20. Furman quarterback Whitey Rawl scored three touchdowns.

Week 3: Clemson

The Wolfpack beat the Clemson Tigers 18–6. Though Jack McDowall did not score any of the touchdowns his play resulted in all the scores, including passes to Childress and Goodwin.

The starting lineup for the Wolfpack against Florida: Goodwin (left end), Evans (left tackle), Vaughan (left guard), Metts (center), Nicholson (right guard), Lepo (right tackle), Childress (right end), Adams (quarterback), Outen (left halfback), McDowall (right halfback), Warren (fullback). Herman Stegeman was umpire.

Week 4: Wake Forest
The Wake Forest Demon Deacons were defeated 30–7. McDowall threw several passes, and returned a punt  60 yards for a touchdown.

Week 5: at Florida

In the fifth week of play, the Wolfpack faced captain Jack McDowall's native Florida Gators in Tampa, winning 12–6. Neither team scored until the final period.  Since McDowall had been turned down by the University of Florida, legend has it just afterwards he mailed coach Tom Sebring the game ball.

A drive brought  the Wolfpack to the 3-yard line, the feature play of which was a 30-yard pass from McDowall to Childress. A pass from McDowall to Frank Goodwin got the score. The Gators then began passing desperately in an attempt to win. A pass bounced off the hands of a Florida back and into McDowall's, who returned the ball 75 yards for the deciding score. On the ensuing kickoff, Gator back Tommy Owens ran it back for an 88-yard touchdown.

The starting lineup for the Wolfpack against Florida: Goodwin (left end), Lepo (left tackle), Nicholson (left guard), Metts (center), Vaughan (right guard), Evans (right tackle), Childress (right end), Adams (quarterback), McDowall (left halfback), Cram (right halfback), Warren (fullback).

Week 6: North Carolina

NC State defeated the in-state rival North Carolina Tar Heels 19 to 6.

The first score came after a 30-yard pass from Jack McDowall to Hunsucker set up a 9-yard end run from McDowall for touchdown. The third touchdown was a 4-yard touchdown pass the width of the field from McDowall to Hunsucker.

The starting lineup for the Wolfpack against North Carolina: Goodwin (left end), Evans (left tackle), Vaughan (left guard), Metts (center), Nicholson (right guard), Lepo (right tackle), Childress (right end), Adams (quarterback), McDowall (left halfback), Hunsucker (right halfback), Lipscomb (fullback).

Week 7: vs. Davidson

The Wolf Pack beat the Davidson Wildcats 25–6. McDowall had a run of 65 yards.

The starting lineup was: Goodwin (left end), Evans (left tackle), Vaughan (left guard), Metts (center), C. Nicholson (right guard), Lepo (right tackle), Childress (right end), Adams (quarterback), Hunsucker (left halfback), McDowall (right halfback), Warren (fullback).

Week 8: at Duke
NC State defeated Duke in Durham 20–18 "in one of the most thrilling football battles ever staged in N. C." After the Blue Devils rushed out to an early 12–0 lead, McDowall's two drop kicks proved the difference.

Week 9: at South Carolina
The South Carolina Gamecocks were shutout 34–0.

Week 10: Michigan State

Sources:

In the season's final game, NC State hosted a northern opponent, the Michigan Aggies.  On a muddy, waterlogged field, the Wolfpack won 19 to 0.

Captain Jack McDowall was cited as the best player in his final game, despite his only scoring play being a pass for an extra point.

Awards and honors
All-Southern: Jack McDowall

Players

Line

Backfield

Coaching staff
Head coach: Gus Tebell
Assistants: Butch Slaughter, Doc Sermon

References

Sources
 

NC State
NC State Wolfpack football seasons
Southern Conference football champion seasons
NC State Wolfpack football